In non-Euclidean geometry, the Poincaré half-plane model is the upper half-plane, denoted below as H , together with a metric, the Poincaré metric, that makes it a model of two-dimensional hyperbolic geometry.

Equivalently the Poincaré half-plane model is sometimes described as a complex plane where the imaginary part (the y coordinate mentioned above) is positive.

The Poincaré half-plane model is named after Henri Poincaré, but it originated with Eugenio Beltrami who used it, along with the Klein model and the Poincaré disk model, to show that hyperbolic geometry was equiconsistent with Euclidean geometry.

This model is conformal which means that the angles measured at a point are the same in the model as they are in the actual hyperbolic plane.

The Cayley transform provides an isometry between the half-plane model and the Poincaré disk model.

This model  can be generalized to model an  dimensional hyperbolic space by replacing the real number x by a vector in an n dimensional Euclidean vector space.

Metric

The metric of the model on the half-plane,  is:

where s measures the length along a (possibly curved) line.
The straight lines in the hyperbolic plane (geodesics for this metric tensor, i.e., curves which minimize the distance) are represented in this model by circular arcs perpendicular to the x-axis (half-circles whose centers are on the x-axis) and straight vertical rays perpendicular to the x-axis.

Distance calculation 

This  formula can be thought of as coming from the chord length in the Minkowski metric between points in the hyperboloid model,  analogous to finding arclength on a sphere in terms of chord length. This  formula can be thought of as coming from Euclidean distance in the Poincaré disk model with one point at the origin, analogous to finding arclength on the sphere by taking a stereographic projection centered on one point and measuring the Euclidean distance in the plane from the origin to the other point.

Cf. Cross-ratio.

Some special cases can be simplified. Two points with the same  coordinate:

Two points with the same  coordinate:

One point  at the apex of the semicircle  and another point at a central angle of 

Special points and curves

 Ideal points (points at infinity) in the Poincaré half-plane model are of two kinds:
 the points on the  x-axis, and

 Straight lines, geodesics (the shortest path between the points contained within it) are modeled by either:
 half-circles whose origin is on the x-axis
 straight vertical rays orthogonal to the x-axis

 A circle (curves equidistant from a central point) with center  and radius  is modeled by:
 a circle with center  and radius 

 A hypercycle (a curve equidistant from a straight line, its axis) is modeled by either:
 a circular arc which intersects the x-axis at the same two ideal points as the half-circle which models its axis but at an acute or obtuse angle
 a straight line which intersects the x-axis at the same point as the vertical line which models its axis, but at an acute or obtuse angle.

 A horocycle (a curve whose normals all converge asymptotically in the same direction, its center) is modeled by either:
 a circle tangent to the x-axis (but excluding the ideal point of intersection, which is its center)

Euclidean synopsis

A Euclidean circle with center  and radius  represents: 
 when the circle is completely inside the halfplane a hyperbolic circle with center 
 
and radius 
 
 when the circle is completely inside the halfplane and touches the boundary a horocycle centered around the ideal point 
 when the circle intersects the boundary orthogonal   a hyperbolic line
 when the circle intersects the boundary non- orthogonal a hypercycle.

Compass and straightedge constructions 

Here is how one can use compass and straightedge constructions in the model to achieve the effect of the basic constructions in the hyperbolic plane.
For example, how to construct the half-circle in the Euclidean half-plane which models a line on the hyperbolic plane through two given points.

Creating the line through two existing points 

Draw the line segment between the two points. Construct the perpendicular bisector of the line segment. Find its intersection with the x-axis. Draw the circle around the intersection which passes through the given points. Erase the part which is on or below the x-axis.

Or in the special case where the two given points lie on a vertical line, draw that vertical line through the two points and erase the part which is on or below the x-axis.

Creating the circle through one point with center another point 

If the two points are not on a vertical line:

Draw the radial line (half-circle) between the two given points as in the previous case. Construct a tangent to that line at the non-central point. Drop a perpendicular from the given center point to the x-axis. Find the intersection of these two lines to get the center of the model circle. Draw the model circle around that new center and passing through the given non-central point.

If the two given points lie on a vertical line and the given center is above the other given point:

Draw a circle around the intersection of the vertical line and the x-axis which passes through the given central point.
Draw a horizontal line through the non-central point.
Construct the tangent to the circle at its intersection with that horizontal line.

The midpoint between the intersection of the tangent with the vertical line and the given non-central point is the center of the model circle.
Draw the model circle around that new center and passing through the given non-central point.

If the two given points lie on a vertical line and the given center is below the other given point:

Draw a circle around the intersection of the vertical line and the x-axis which passes through the given central point.
Draw a line tangent to the circle which passes through the given non-central point.
Draw a horizontal line through that point of tangency and find its intersection with the vertical line.

The midpoint between that intersection and the given non-central point is the center of the model circle.
Draw the model circle around that new center and passing through the given non-central point.

Given a circle find its (hyperbolic) center 

Drop a perpendicular p from the Euclidean center of the circle to the x-axis.

Let point q be the intersection of this line and the x- axis.

Draw a line tangent to the circle going through q.

Draw the half circle h with center q going through the point where the tangent and the circle meet.

The (hyperbolic) center is the point where h and p intersect.

Other constructions 

Creating the point which is the intersection of two existing lines, if they intersect:
Find the intersection of the two given semicircles (or vertical lines).

Creating the one or two points in the intersection of a line and a circle (if they intersect):
Find the intersection of the given semicircle (or vertical line) with the given circle.

Creating the one or two points in the intersection of two circles (if they intersect):
Find the intersection of the two given circles.

Symmetry groups

The projective linear group PGL(2,C) acts on the Riemann sphere by the Möbius transformations. The subgroup that maps the upper half-plane, H, onto itself is PSL(2,R), the transforms with real coefficients, and these act transitively and isometrically on the upper half-plane, making it a homogeneous space.

There are four closely related Lie groups that act on the upper half-plane by fractional linear transformations and preserve the hyperbolic distance.

 The special linear group SL(2,R) which consists of the set of 2×2 matrices with real entries whose determinant equals +1. Note that many texts (including Wikipedia) often say SL(2,R) when they really mean PSL(2,R).
 The group S*L(2,R) consisting of the set of 2×2 matrices with real entries whose determinant equals +1 or −1. Note that SL(2,R) is a subgroup of this group.
 The projective special linear group PSL(2,R) = SL(2,R)/{±I}, consisting of the matrices in SL(2,R) modulo plus or minus the identity matrix.
The group PS*L(2,R) = S*L(2,R)/{±I}=PGL(2,R) is again a projective group, and again, modulo plus or minus the identity matrix. PSL(2,R) is contained as an index-two normal subgroup, the other coset being the set of 2×2 matrices with real entries whose determinant equals −1, modulo plus or minus the identity.

The relationship of these groups to the Poincaré model is as follows:
 The group of all isometries of H, sometimes denoted as Isom(H), is isomorphic to PS*L(2,R). This includes both the orientation preserving and the orientation-reversing isometries.
 The group of orientation-preserving isometries of H, sometimes denoted as Isom+(H), is isomorphic to PSL(2,R).

Important subgroups of the isometry group are the Fuchsian groups.

One also frequently sees the modular group SL(2,Z). This group is important in two ways. First, it is a symmetry group of the square 2x2 lattice of points. Thus, functions that are periodic on a square grid, such as modular forms and elliptic functions, will thus inherit an SL(2,Z) symmetry from the grid. Second, SL(2,Z) is of course a subgroup of SL(2,R), and thus has a hyperbolic behavior embedded in it. In particular, SL(2,Z) can be used to tessellate the hyperbolic plane into cells of equal (Poincaré) area.

Isometric symmetry

Note that the action is transitive: for any , there exists a  such that . It is also faithful, in that if  for all  then g = e.

The stabilizer of i is the rotation group

Thus, .

The upper half-plane is tessellated into free regular sets by the modular group

Geodesics

The geodesics for this metric tensor are circular arcs perpendicular to the real axis (half-circles whose origin is on the real axis) and straight vertical lines ending on the real axis.

The unit-speed geodesic going up vertically, through the point i is given by

Because PSL(2,R) acts transitively by isometries of the upper half-plane, this geodesic is mapped into the other geodesics through the action of PSL(2,R). Thus, the general unit-speed geodesic is given by

This provides a basic description of the geodesic flow on the unit-length tangent bundle (complex line bundle) on the upper half-plane. Starting with this model, one can obtain the flow on arbitrary Riemann surfaces, as described in the article on the Anosov flow.

The model in three dimensions 

The metric of the model on the half- space  is given by

where s measures length along a possibly curved line.
The straight lines in the hyperbolic space (geodesics for this metric tensor, i.e. curves which minimize the distance) are represented in this model by circular arcs normal to the z = 0-plane (half-circles whose origin is on the z = 0-plane) and straight vertical rays normal to the z = 0-plane.

The distance between two points  and  measured in this metric along such a geodesic is:

The model in n dimensions 
This model  can be generalized to model an  dimensional hyperbolic space by replacing the real number x by a vector in an n dimensional Euclidean vector space.

See also

 Angle of parallelism
 Anosov flow
 Fuchsian group
 Fuchsian model
 Hyperbolic motion
 Kleinian model
 Models of the hyperbolic plane
 Pseudosphere
 Schwarz–Ahlfors–Pick theorem
 Ultraparallel theorem

References
Notes

Sources

 Eugenio Beltrami, Teoria fondamentale degli spazi di curvatura constante, Annali di Matematica Pura ed Applicata, ser II 2 (1868), 232–255
 Henri Poincaré (1882) "Théorie des Groupes Fuchsiens", Acta Mathematica v.1, p. 1. First article in a legendary series exploiting the half-plane model. An archived copy is freely available. On page 52 one can see an example of the semicircle diagrams so characteristic of the model.
 Hershel M. Farkas and Irwin Kra, Riemann Surfaces (1980), Springer-Verlag, New York. .
 Jürgen Jost, Compact Riemann Surfaces (2002), Springer-Verlag, New York.  (See Section 2.3).
 Saul Stahl, The Poincaré Half-Plane, Jones and Bartlett, 1993, .
 John Stillwell (1998) Numbers and Geometry, pp. 100–104, Springer-Verlag, NY . An elementary introduction to the Poincaré half-plane model of the hyperbolic plane.

Conformal geometry
Hyperbolic geometry
Half-plane model